Lois B. Mitchell Haibt (born 1934) is an American computer scientist best known for being a member of the ten-person team at IBM that developed FORTRAN, the first successful high-level programming language. She is known as an early pioneer in computer science.

Education and career
Haibt studied mathematics at Vassar College with an academic scholarship. She graduated with a bachelor's degree in 1955. While at Vassar, Haibt worked at Bell Laboratories during the summer.

Immediately after graduating from Vassar, Haibt began working at IBM. She started with an annual salary of $5,100, despite her lack of prior programming experience. This sum was almost double the amount that she would have made at Bell Laboratories. Haibt inferred that any job with such a high salary would be difficult, but fascinating. She was part of an academically diverse team of ten young people with varying academic degrees and unrelated areas of expertise, such as crystallography and cryptography. Experience with mathematics was their one common connection. Haibt was the only woman on the team.

According to Haibt, the team worked well together: "No one was worried about seeming stupid or possessive of his or her code. We were all just learning together." The FORTRAN team worked nontraditional hours so that they could have unlimited access to the IBM 704 computer. They frequently rented rooms at the nearby Langdon Hotel in order to sleep during the day and work at night.

In 1957, Haibt attended Columbia University.

Haibt is a member of the Mathematical Association of America.

Research contributions
The IBM team spent almost three years creating the programming language FORTRAN, which reformed the way people communicate instructions to computers.

Haibt was in charge of section four of the FORTRAN project. She analyzed the flow of programs produced by other sections of the compiler. Her estimates of  flow in high-traffic areas of the computer were obtained by calculating how often basic blocks of the program would execute. Haibt employed Monte Carlo methods (statistical analysis) for these calculations. Through this process, she also created the first syntactic analyzer of arithmetic expressions. Haibt planned and programmed the entire section.
Haibt was also part of an eleven-person team to develop and release the first reference manual for FORTRAN in 1956.

Personal life
Haibt was married to Luther Haibt (May 4, 1929 – December 3, 2000), a systems analyst at IBM in Thornwood, NY. The Haibts spent their adult lives in New York state. Haibt's daughter, Carolyn, attended Princeton University for her bachelor's degree and went on to receive a Ph.D. in mathematics from the Massachusetts Institute of Technology. Haibt's hobbies include interior decorating and reading.

Works 
 Original Paper on FORTRAN from 1957
Casting Petri Nets into Programs, September 1983

See also
List of prominent pioneers in computer science

References

External links

Living people
American computer programmers
Fortran
Vassar College alumni
American women computer scientists
American computer scientists
1934 births
People from Katonah, New York
IBM employees
21st-century American women